Marlene Robyn Castle (born 13 March 1944) is a lawn and indoor bowls international for New Zealand.

Bowls career
The veteran of four Commonwealth Games won her first medal at the 1990 Commonwealth Games, earning a silver in the women's fours. Again as part of the women's fours team she won a bronze medal at the 1994 Commonwealth Games. Her last Commonwealth medal was at the 2002 Commonwealth Games where she won a bronze in the women's singles.

Castle has won twelve medals at the Asia Pacific Bowls Championships including five gold medals.

Castle won the 2001 pairs title and the 1999 fours title at the New Zealand National Bowls Championships when bowling for the Orewa Bowls Club.

Awards
In 1990, Castle was awarded the New Zealand 1990 Commemoration Medal. In 2013, she  was an inaugural inductee into the Bowls New Zealand Hall of Fame.

Personal life
Her husband is Bruce Castle, a former New Zealand Kiwis captain, and her daughter Raelene Castle is a sports administrator. Raelene has previously served as the Chief Executive Officer of Netball New Zealand and the Canterbury-Bankstown Bulldogs, and became the CEO of Rugby Australia in December 2017.

References

Living people
1944 births
New Zealand female bowls players
Commonwealth Games silver medallists for New Zealand
Commonwealth Games bronze medallists for New Zealand
Bowls players at the 1990 Commonwealth Games
Bowls players at the 1994 Commonwealth Games
Bowls players at the 1998 Commonwealth Games
Bowls players at the 2002 Commonwealth Games
Commonwealth Games medallists in lawn bowls
Indoor Bowls World Champions
Medallists at the 1990 Commonwealth Games
Medallists at the 1994 Commonwealth Games
Medallists at the 2002 Commonwealth Games